Future War is a 1997 American direct-to-video science fiction film about an escaped human slave fleeing his cyborg masters and seeking refuge on Earth. It was lampooned in a 1999 episode of Mystery Science Theater 3000.

Plot
A spaceship is undergoing a revolt. A man enters and activates an escape pod which travels to Earth and crashes into the Pacific Ocean. The pod contains “The Runaway”, a human slave played by Daniel Bernhardt. He is being pursued by cyborg slavers and dinosaurs that they use as “trackers”. Since he was kidnapped some time from Earth's past, The Runaway is familiar with the English language and the King James Bible, and he regards Earth as a literal heaven.

The Runaway finds refuge with novice nun Sister Ann (Travis Brooks Stewart), whose past involved dealing drugs and prostitution. Together, they fight the dinosaurs and their robotic masters, seeking help from a street gang. Future War features star Daniel Bernhardt's kickboxing skills in several fight sequences, including against the Cyborg Master (Robert Z'Dar).

After being arrested as a suspect in a rash of deaths due to strange animal attacks, The Runaway is interrogated by federal agents. They present to him a dinosaur collar found on the beach. The Cyborg Master breaks into the police station during the interrogation and The Runaway manages to escape in the confusion. He returns to Sister Ann and her gang friends with a plan to attack the dinosaurs where they live, as Runaway simply explains, "Near water...".

Using dynamite, The Runaway successfully destroys a water treatment plant, killing the dinosaurs. Later, though, the surviving Cyborg Master attacks The Runaway while he watches Sister Ann make her final vows to become a nun. After The Runaway finally kills the Cyborg Master, he becomes a counselor for runaway teens, working closely with Sister Ann.

Cast
 Daniel Bernhardt as The Runaway
 Travis Brooks Stewart as Sister Ann
 Robert Z’Dar as Cyborg Master
 Mel Novak as SWAT Leader
 Forrest J Ackerman as Park Victim
 Solly Assa as Cyborg Dominic

Production
This was the directorial debut of Anthony Doublin, the award-winning special effect/miniature model maker from films like Bride of Re-Animator and the Carnosaur films. The actual "tracker" feet and mechanical tracker from Future War were taken by Doublin for use in Carnosaur 3.

During the movie's production crew members joked that the film should end up on Mystery Science Theater 3000. When Doublin finished his work, he turned in a director's cut that ran with 40 minutes of mostly dialogue. Future War was screened for several members of the crew. After the screening a discussion was held and Doublin quit, forcing a "Damage Control Unit" to be organized. Johnny Saiko from Steve Wang FX was brought in to take over the "trackers" and the film was completed and screened at AFM.

Mystery Science Theater 3000
Future War was featured in the season 10 of the movie-mocking television series Mystery Science Theater 3000 in April, 1999. Mike Nelson and his crew commented on the low-budget look (several scenes are in a warehouse where people are stacking apparently empty boxes), the use of forced perspective for the dinosaur sequences, Bernhardt's near-similar appearance to Jean-Claude Van Damme (referred to as "Jean-Claude Gosh Darn" by Nelson), and the overall nonsensical nature of the film. As Crow T. Robot remarked, “You know, I could point out that it’s not the future, and there isn’t a war, but you know me; I don't like to complain.”

Having first been released in 1997, it was the most recent film to be featured on the original run of the series. The next most recent was Merlin's Shop of Mystical Wonders, which was released in 1996, and also lampooned in a 1999 episode.

Release history
Future War was released directly to home video on January 28, 1997 by Screen Pix Home Video. It was later released on Region 1 DVD by Trinity Home Entertainment on May 4, 2004.

There was also a 2002 DVD release by EVG Digital Entertainment.  This release contained no bonus materials.  Despite the film itself being unrated, the Film Advisory Board rated this DVD EM or "Extremely Mature" (the equivalent of an R rating from the MPAA).

The film was also released on DVD as part of the Mystery Science Theater 3000: 20th Anniversary Edition DVD set released by Shout! Factory on October 8, 2008.

Legacy
In 2015, the film was featured on an episode of Red Letter Media's Best of the Worst, together with The Jar and White Fire. The film was positively received by the hosts, who named it as the episode's "Best of the Worst".

References

External links

Mystery Science Theater 3000
 
 Episode guide: 1004- Future War

1997 films
1997 independent films
1990s science fiction action films
American independent films
American science fiction action films
Cyborg films
Films about dinosaurs
1990s English-language films
Films set in Los Angeles
Films shot in Los Angeles
Direct-to-video science fiction films
Films about time travel
1997 directorial debut films
1990s American films